The women's 60 metres event at the 2003 IAAF World Indoor Championships was held on March 14.

Zhanna Block originally won the gold medal, but she was disqualified in 2011 after her results from 30 November 2002 and onward were deleted as part of a sanction in connection with the BALCO scandal. Angela Williams was instead promoted to 2003 World champion.

Medalists

Results

Heats
First 4 of each heat (Q) and next 4 fastest (q) qualified for the semifinals.

Semifinals
First 2 of each semifinal (Q) and next 2 fastest (q) qualified for the final.

Final

References

Results

60
60 metres at the World Athletics Indoor Championships
2003 in women's athletics